"The Big Battle" is a song written and originally recorded by Johnny Cash.

The song was released as a single by Columbia Records (Columbia 4-42301, with "When I've Learned" on the opposite side) in January, February, or March 1962. The song was later used on the concept album America: A 200-Year Salute in Story and Song.

Composition

Charts

References 

Johnny Cash songs
1962 singles
Songs written by Johnny Cash
Columbia Records singles
1962 songs